The Baj Pomorski Theatre is a puppet theatre, located in Toruń in Poland.

History
The Baj Pomorski Theatre was started thanks to Irena Pikiel-Samorewiczowa – an artist, painter, and repatriate from Vilnius who had come to Bydgoszcz in April 1945, possessing a document from The Ministry of Arts and Culture (dated April 1, 1945), entitling her to organize the first puppet theatre in Pomerania. It was supposed to be a younger brother of Warsaw's Baj Theater, hence the name Baj Pomorski. The Bydgoszcz theatre was situated in the city's slaughterhouse, which had functioned as a German marionette theatre during Nazi occupation. On October 28, 1945, it performed its premiere for children – Ewa Szelburg-Zarembina's Little Wandering Taylor. The conditions of Bydgoszcz's stage did not, however, meet the needs of the young puppet theatre. Therefore, Pikiel very willingly accepted the proposal for moving the headquarters of Baj Pomorski to Toruń. As early as April 1946, the Theatre had been granted a building at 9 Piernikarska Street, which had previously belonged to the German Castle Theatre during the war. It is in this beautiful location near the ruins of the Castle of The Teutonic Knights that the Theatre has been performing till today – extending to the past sixty years.

The first actors of Baj Pomorski were students from The University of Nicholas Copernicus who, under the guidance of experienced actors and directors, took part in theatrical clinics and thereby unearthed the arcana of puppet animation. Work conditions were not easy. The theatre had humble equipment at its disposal, yet it was actively involved in on-the-road performances not only in Pomerania, but also throughout nearly all over Poland. By then Baj Pomorski had already achieved its first success. In 1947, Joanna Piekarska, an artist and director, became the theatre's artistic manager. She directed the performance entitled She-Cat's House which received 3rd prize at the 1st Festival of Russian and Soviet Plays in Warsaw in 1950. This achievement, as well as the theatre's extensive activity, contributed to the nationalization of Toruń's puppet stage. At that time this meant that, on one hand, the institution would gain financial stability, while on the other, certain liberties for creativity, so inherent in pioneering activities, would have to cease.

Directors
From then on the rules of play planning and selection, mandated within a cultural policy, had to be consistently obeyed.
The following directors of the theatre were 
Stanisław Stapf (1950–1960),
Leszek Śmigielski (1960–1972),
Tadeusz Petrykowski (1972–1979),
Konrad Szachnowski (1979–1980),
Antoni Słociński (1980–1988),
Krzysztof Arciszewski (1988–1992),
Wojciech Olejnik (1992–1993),
Czesław Sieńko (1993–2003).
Zbigniew Lisowski has been Baj Pomorski's director since August 1, 2003.

Theatre in 1960–90
All the directors have left their ineffaceable expressions upon Toruń's puppet stage. It was when Stapf was the theatre's acting director that the days of Baj Pomorski's artistic adolescence occurred. He was the one responsible for helping modernize the theatre, making it into one of the best equipped stages in Poland; he displayed a premiere for adults (the first of its kind for the theatre – a Polish preview puppet show of William Shakespeare's A Midsummer Night's Dream; he initiated the North Poland Puppet Theater Festival held in Toruń – Pomerania's first event of this caliber.

During the Sixties, under Śmigielski's management, a further change was brought about in Baj Pomorski's image, from that of a traditional puppet stage to one of a theatre seeking new forms of expression, open to Toruń's artistic life. It was during this time that the largest numbers of preview shows within the history of the theatre were staged; ambitious spectacles (influenced by traditional folk theatre) were created, and innovatory stage productions by contemporary regional authors were shown. The Club of Creative Circles Azyl, formed during that time, was a unique artistic phenomenon in Poland, making Baj Pomorski the center of cultural life and the venue for many a theatrical initiative.

Thanks to Tadeusz Petrykowski the theatre reanimated its cooperation with theatre groups abroad, including those from the Czech Republic and Romania; it also increased its participation in Polish puppet festivals.

Konrad Szachnowski made his name in Baj's past by coming up with a modern concept for staging theatrical classics. His preview puppet show of Fernando de Rojas’ Celestine found its place in Polish puppet theatre's historic lore by using an amazingly creative theatrical idea involving supermarionettes and trashy theatre.

The eight years of Antoni Słociński's management resulted in the development of theatrical education programs for children; besides this the theatre began to mark its presence at international festivals, with cooperation with German (mainly in Göttingen – one of Toruń's partner cities) and Czech theatres, growing stronger in the process.

The following directors – Krzysztof Arciszewski and Wojciech Olejnik – presumably continued to expand upon programs based upon previously developed images of the theatre. An important modification introduced during that time was the transformation of the theatre into an institution financed by the City of Toruń.

Theatre after 1990

Further development of Baj Pomorski occurred under the management of Czesław Sieńko. This was the era democracy being stabilized in Poland, the executive branch of the government undergoing structural changes, and transformation sweeping throughout all areas of economy, culture and social life. The repertoire included stage productions of the most interesting novels for children and teenagers which had up until then been absent from thespian arts. The theatre took its first steps in promoting new European literature for children. Innovatory scenographic suggestions taught audiences based on one's involvement in the performance. Never before in its history had Baj Pomorski spectacles received so many awards and honors. In 1994 Sieńko initiated Toruń's Meetings of Puppet Theaters. In 1999 this evolved to become Toruń's International Meetings of Puppet Theaters which has become a perpetual event in Toruń's puppet stage activity.
Toruń's International Meetings of Puppet Theatres is one of the few events of this type and size in Poland. It is held in October on a yearly basis. Throughout this week of contests and challenges one can see the most interesting theatres from around the world –masters of puppetry, artists nurturing the tradition of the puppet theatre, and groups searching and experimenting within the nature of the loosely termed animation theatre. Eleven events have been held thus far, confirming the high rank of the festival from a list of theatrical events both within and beyond Poland.

The present director of Baj Pomorski has since made Toruń's puppet stage into an open theatre, vividly responding to the city's needs and present-day trends. Its message, though targeted mostly at children and teenagers, is intended to reach every student and adult. Hopes for the coming years are for the modernization and development of the theatre's main building. Planned on a wide scale it will change its look, making it one of Poland's most modern and interesting stages, and not only from the architectural point of view. By giving the building the characteristics of an enormous, magical, theatrical wardrobe it will be transformed into a place where, for both Toruń's residents and tourists alike, it can serve as the locale for interplay, wherein the mysteries of its theatre and the beauty of its architecture enwrap together the Old and New Town settings.

Selected reference

Marzena Wiśniewska, History of Toruń's puppet scene in 1945-2005 in: 60 years of The Baj Pomorski Theatre, Toruń, 2005.
English translation by Agnieszka Klonowska and Wolf V. Werling

External links

Official website of The Baj Pomorski Theatre, in Polish and English

Theatres in Toruń
Buildings and structures in Toruń
Puppet theaters
1945 establishments in Poland
Tourist attractions in Kuyavian-Pomeranian Voivodeship